Natalie Sims (born 6 June 1997) is an American Paralympic swimmer who competes in international level events. She was born without her right hand. 

She is the cousin of Dragomir Cioroslan who is a bronze medalist at the 1984 Summer Olympics in Los Angeles.

References

1997 births
Living people
Sportspeople from Edina, Minnesota
Sportspeople from Minneapolis
Paralympic swimmers of the United States
Swimmers at the 2016 Summer Paralympics
Medalists at the World Para Swimming Championships
Medalists at the 2019 Parapan American Games
Wisconsin–La Crosse Eagles
College women's swimmers in the United States
American female freestyle swimmers
American female medley swimmers
S9-classified Paralympic swimmers
21st-century American women